Energy economics is a broad scientific subject area which includes topics related to supply and use of energy in societies. Considering the cost of energy services and associated value gives economic meaning to the efficiency at which energy can be produced. Energy services can be defined as functions that generate and provide energy to the “desired end services or states”. The efficiency of energy services is dependent on the engineered technology used to produce and supply energy. The goal is to minimise energy input required (e.g. kWh, mJ, see Units of Energy) to produce the energy service, such as lighting (lumens), heating (temperature) and fuel (natural gas). The main sectors considered in energy economics are transportation and building, although it is relevant to a broad scale of human activities, including households and businesses at a microeconomic level and resource management and environmental impacts at a macroeconomic level.

Due to diversity of issues and methods applied and shared with a number of academic disciplines, energy economics does not present itself as a self-contained academic discipline, but it is an applied subdiscipline of economics. From the list of main topics of economics, some relate strongly to energy economics:
 Computable general equilibrium
 Econometrics
 Environmental economics
 Finance
 Industrial organization
 Input–output model
 Microeconomics
 Macroeconomics
 Operations research
 Resource economics
Energy economics also draws heavily on results of energy engineering, geology, political sciences, ecology etc. Recent focus of energy economics includes the following issues:
 Climate change and climate policy
 Demand response
 Elasticity of supply and demand in energy market
 Energy and economic growth
 Energy derivatives
 Energy elasticity
 Energy forecasting
 Energy markets and electricity markets  - liberalisation, (de- or re-) regulation
 Economics of energy infrastructure
 Energy policy
 Environmental policy
 Risk analysis and security of supply
 Sustainability

Some institutions of higher education (universities) recognise energy economics as a viable career opportunity, offering this as a curriculum. The University of Cambridge, Massachusetts Institute of Technology and the  Vrije Universiteit Amsterdam are the top three research universities, and Resources for the Future the top research institute. There are numerous other research departments, companies, and professionals offering energy economics studies and consultations.

History

Energy related issues have been actively present in economic literature since the 1973 oil crisis, but have their roots much further back in the history. As early as 1865, W.S. Jevons expressed his concern about the eventual depletion of coal resources in his book The Coal Question. One of the best known early attempts to work on the economics of exhaustible resources (incl. fossil fuel) was made by H. Hotelling, who derived a price path for non-renewable resources, known as Hotelling's rule.

Development of energy economics theory over the last two centuries can be attributed to three main economic subjects – the rebound effect, the energy efficiency gap and more recently, 'green nudges'.

The Rebound Effect (1860s to 1930s)

While energy efficiency is improved with new technology, expected energy savings are less-than proportional to the efficiency gains due to behavioural responses. There are three behavioural sub-theories to be considered: the direct rebound effect, which anticipates increased use of the energy service that was improved; the indirect rebound effect, which considers an increased income effect created by savings then allowing for increased energy consumption, and; the economy-wide effect, which results from an increase in energy prices due to the newly developed technology improvements.

The Energy Efficiency Gap (1980s to 1990s)

Suboptimal investment in improvement of energy efficiency resulting from market failures/barriers prevents the optimal use of energy. From an economical standpoint, a rational decision-maker with perfect information will optimally choose between the trade-off of initial investment and energy costs. However, due to uncertainties such as environmental externalities, the optimal potential energy efficiency is not always able to be achieved, thus creating an energy efficiency gap.

Green Nudges (1990s to Current)

While the energy efficiency gap considers economical investments, it does not consider behavioural anomalies in energy consumers. Growing concerns surrounding climate change and other environmental impacts have led to what economists would describe as irrational behaviours being exhibited by energy consumers. A contribution to this has been government interventions, coined "green nudges’ by Thaler and Sustein (2008), such as feedback on energy bills. Now that it is realised people do not behave rationally, research into energy economics is more focused on behaviours and impacting decision-making to close the energy efficiency gap.

Sources, links and portals

Leading journals of energy economics include:
 Energy Economics
 The Energy Journal
 Resource and Energy Economics

There are several other journals that regularly publish papers in energy economics:
 Energy – The International Journal
 Energy Policy
 International Journal of Global Energy Issues
 Journal of Energy Markets
 Utilities Policy

Much progress in energy economics has been made through the conferences of the International Association for Energy Economics, the model comparison exercises of the (Stanford)  Energy Modeling Forum and the meetings of the International Energy Workshop.

IDEAS/RePEc has a collection of recent working papers.

Leading energy economists
The top 20 leading energy economists as of December 2016 are:

 Martin L. Weitzman
 Lutz Kilian
 Robert S. Pindyck
 David M Newbery
 Kenneth J. Arrow
 Richard S.J. Tol
 Severin Borenstein
 Richard G. Newell
 Frederick (Rick) van der Ploeg
 Michael Greenstone
 Richard Schmalensee
 James Hamilton
 Robert Norman Stavins
 Ilhan Ozturk
 Paul Joskow
 Ramazan Sari
 Jeffrey A. Frankel
 David Ian Stern
 Kenneth S. Rogoff
 Rafal Weron
 Michael Gerald Pollitt
 Ugur Soytas

See also

 Energy economists (category)
Cost of electricity by source
Ecological economics
Embodied energy
Energy accounting
Energy & Environment
Energy balance
Energy policy
Energy subsidy
EROEI
Industrial ecology
International Energy Agency
List of energy storage projects
List of energy topics
Social metabolism
Sustainable energy
Thermoeconomics

References

Further reading
How to Measure the True Cost of Fossil Fuels March 30, 2013 Scientific American
Bhattacharyya, S. (2011). Energy Economics: Concepts, Issues, Markets, and Governance. London: Springer-Verlag limited.
Herberg, Mikkal (2014). Energy Security and the Asia-Pacific: Course Reader. United States: The National Bureau of Asian Research.
Zweifel, P., Praktiknjo, A., Erdmann, G. (2017). Energy Economics - Theory and Applications. Berlin, Heidelberg: Springer-Verlag.

 
Environmental social science
Economics
Resource economics